Time Weekly may refer to:

The Time Weekly, Chinese newspaper based in Guangzhou, Guangdong
Maui Time Weekly, American newspaper based in Maui, Hawaii